Parachabora is a genus of moths of the family Erebidae. The genus was described by Warren in 1889.

Species
 Parachabora abydas Herrich-Schäffer, [1869]
 Parachabora pseudanaetia Dyar, 1918
 Parachabora triangulifera Hampson, 1901
 Parachabora umbrescens Dyar, 1927

References

Calpinae
Moth genera